Australian rules football in the Australian Capital Territory has been played continuously since 1911 and was the most popular football code in the nation's capital Canberra between 1978 and 1982. The current governing body is AFL NSW/ACT established in 1999.

Until 1982 the sport was widely covered in the local media and the premier local competition attracted significant interest. The ACT was one of the first proponents for a national Australian rules football competition (now the Australian Football League) and it became the first state or territory outside of Victoria to make an official bid to join the league. The (rejected) Canberra bid in 1981 was dismissed in favour of a Sydney team, which became the Sydney Swans. Canberra has made numerous failed bids since, including bids to move the Swans when they became insolvent. However, the popularity of Australian rules football suffered substantially after the introduction of the Raiders (rugby league in 1982) and Brumbies (rugby union in 1996). As a result it fell behind both rugby codes and also soccer and is now classified as a minor sport with the lowest media profile and attendance of the four major football codes. 

While it remains by far the second most participated football code and retains a loyal support base as well as a strong local competition, the sport in the ACT has continued a slow decline since the 1980s. Occasional AFL matches were played by neutral sides from 2001. Since 2012 the AFL has positioned Greater Western Sydney Giants as a local side, scheduling three home games a year at Manuka Oval. In 2013, 2016, 2021 and 2022 the stadium's average attendance was higher than that of the Giants home, the Sydney Showgrounds, despite having 10,000 less available seats and a schedule of lower drawing opposition clubs. At least 6,400 GWS members were ACT-based at the end of 2022. The club in 2015 set a target to overtake the Raiders membership in 2018 with more than 10,000+ members, however Raiders membership rapidly outpaced it growing its record to more than 4 times that of GWS.

Home grown hero Alex Jesaulenko and Australian Football Hall of Fame legend was a household name in the 1970s in Canberra.  Jesaulenko has played more games and kicked more goals in the AFL than any other player from the ACT. James Hird is the only Canberran to win the prestigious Brownlow Medal. Both are multi premiership players. Britt Tully (games) and Jacqueline Parry (goals) share the honours in the AFLW. The ACT is classed as a development region by the AFL and in the AFL Draft, ACT is designated priority AFL recruitment zoning for the Greater Western Sydney Giants (and previously Sydney Swans), so most of the local players recruited from the ACT to the AFL (unless overlooked) generally start their careers at one of these two New South Wales based clubs.
 
The ACT debuted at representative level in 1925 against New South Wales, its first win coming in 1941 against New South Wales and went on to also defeat Queensland and the National Amateur team numerous times between the 1950s and 1980s culminating in defeats of the powerhouses of the VFL in 1980 and Tasmania in 1981. Kevin "Cowboy" Neale captained the side to many of these victories. It was also the third side to enter the National Underage Championships in 1973 however it never won the tournament and now participates as part of a combined NSW/ACT side.

History

Both rugby union and soccer were been played in what was known as the Queanbeyan-Yass region as early as 1907-1910. While it was sparsely populated prior to the establishment of the Federal Territory, these two codes were well established in the existing townships by the time that the Federal Territory was created. Following the Federation of Australia in 1908, Canberra became the new planned national capital. Between 1901 and 1927 Melbourne had served as the National Capital. The gradual migration of civil servants from Melbourne to Canberra helped fuel strong early enthusiasm for the Australian rules.

1911 saw the first recorded match of Australian rules in what was informally known as "Canberra" was an exhibition match between the Royal Military College and employees of the Home Affairs Department on the 29th July.

Three teams (Canberra, Duntroon and Federals) contested matches at the Acton Racecourse (now covered by Lake Burley Griffin) and at Blanfordia (now Manuka Oval).

The Federal Territory League Australian Rules Football League began in 1924 with founding members Acton and Queanbeyan. The following year, the premiership was contested by 4 clubs including Canberra, Federal and Duntroon. By 1926 the competition had gained popularity and was contested by 5 clubs.

New clubs gradually entered the league, when in 1927 it became known as the Canberra Australian National Football League (CANFL).

In 1931, the Canberra Australian National Junior League was formed.

World War II
The ACTAFL lost 95% of its players during World War II.

1970s Building on strong foundations
In 1974 the ACT hosted an Aboriginal Australian rules tournament, which included one of the earliest international matches. The Papua New Guinea national Australian rules football team visited to play an Indigenous Australian side in 1974 and played at Ainslie Oval defeating the Australian side.

Gate takings increased by 40% in 1975, and the CANFL changed to ACTAFL.

In 1977, the ACT was officially invited to join the NFL Night Series. The ACT competed in the 1978 and 1979 seasons. However the move created tensions with the VFL which had sought to establish its own rival national competition. The ACT, along with other states joined the Australian Football Championships Night Series in 1979, and competed also in 1980 and 1981.

1980s & 1990s: AFL declines a licence, rugby popularity grows
In 1981, the ACTAFL, had just begun to edge out rugby league in popularity with an increase in participation. Under significant pressure from rugby league junior development in the territory and fearing the impact on its strong local competition of entry of a Sydney team, a formal bid for license to enter a Canberra team into the VFL was made. The VFL dismissed the Canberra bid, stating that the VFL would consider Canberra for a license "within the next 10 years" the league was insistent that the license should go to Sydney and proceeded instead to push for South Melbourne's Swans to relocate there. The following year, the NSW Rugby League entered the Canberra market with a new Canberra Raiders club. The ACTAFL in 1984 applied to the National Football League to join the national competition which was under consideration at the time. That year the ACTAFL also began discussions with several VFL clubs about moving their home games so that Sydney could play the bulk of its away games in Canberra and Brisbane, but without success.

The VFL designated the ACT an exclusive recruitment zone for the Swans in 1986, which the ACTAFL was not pleased with. In 1986, the Canberra bid was again overlooked in favour of Perth and Brisbane.

In 1988 when the Sydney Swans folded and the licence was put out to tender, the AFLACT moved to buy the club and move it to Canberra; further calls were made to move the Swans to Canberra as they struggled through the early 1990s. The ACTAFL also sought to entice a struggling Melbourne club to relocate (which it claimed to be North Melbourne), without success.

A local lobby group, increasingly frustrated with the national league became very vocal in the 1990s. In 1993 an official "AFL For Canberra Bid" led by Ron Cahill and backed by the ACT government was launched.

The Fitzroy Football Club expressed interest to the AFL in playing home games in Canberra, and the first premiership match to be played in Canberra for Round 9, 1995 match between the Fitzroy and the West Coast Eagles. The match was played at the rectangular Bruce Stadium rather than Manuka Oval. Despite a frost, the match attracted a large amount of interest and a crowd of just under 12,000 attended and the Eagles defeated the struggling Lions by 28 points.

2000s: AFL takes control
In 1998, the AFL (NSW/ACT) Commission took over operations of the ACTAFL. It scheduled North Melbourne Football Club's (the Kangaroos) first premiership match at Manuka Oval which attraced a crowd of 11,321. Canberra also began hosting the Barassi International Australian Football Youth Tournament.

In 2001, the AFL club the Kangaroos signed a deal with the ACT government to play some home matches at Manuka Oval. The move was seen by many as part of a potential relocation of the club to Canberra an idea which had its origins in the mid 1980s. The Kangaroos drew crowds averaging around 10,000 at Manuka Oval. However, in 2007 the club received a more lucrative offer, to play some home games at Carrara Stadium on the Gold Coast, Queensland, and signed a deal to that effect, which was met with significant disgust from Canberra. In August 2006, the AFL announced that the Melbourne Demons and Western Bulldogs would each play home games at Manuka, to fill the void left by the Kangaroos.

GWS adopts Canberra as a 'Second home'

Canberra continued to bid for its own AFL team. This was rejected in 2009 in favour of the Greater Western Sydney license. However, in 2012, the ACT government signed a contract with the GWS Giants to play four home games per season at Manuka Oval (three regular season, one preseason), having signed a 10-year deal worth $23 million. A Canberra logo (incorporating the Black Mountain Tower as a symbol) is incorporated on its guernsey, with a slightly altered Canberra-specific guernsey used for the games at Manuka. The Giants also played in a special guernsey as part of the centenary of Canberra celebrations, stating that the team is "part of the Canberra community". A GWS/ACT Academy has also been envisioned, and the territory has representation on the club's board.

The 2016 round 19 AFL match between GWS Giants and Richmond attracted a record crowd of 14,974, just overtaking the previous 2006 record for the match between the Kangaroos and Sydney.

The first AFLW premiership match played at Manuka, a Giants home game, with free entry  attracted at territory record women's attendance of 6,460 however the league did not schedule any other matches and AFLW did not return to the ACT for another 4 years, and it did so with paid entry to significantly reduced crowds.

Players

Greats
Over the years, the ACT has produced many top players for elite professional leagues such as the Australian Football League, including Alex Jesaulenko, James Hird, Mick Conlan, Craig Bolton, Don Pyke, Shaun Smith, Adrian Barich, Brett Allison, and Aaron Hamill.

Men's

Women's

Governing body
The governing body is AFL NSW/ACT.

Leagues

Open
 North East Australian Football League
 AFL Canberra

Masters
 AFL Canberra Masters Official site

Women's
 Australian Capital Territory Women's Australian Football League

Representative Side
An Australian Capital Territory representative side played Interstate Football matches against other states and territories. Australian Capital Territory's first National Football Carnival appearance was at the 1933 National Football Carnival. The side placed second in Division 2 of the 1958 National Football Carnival, and second in the 1968 Minor States National Football Carnival. In the 1990s, the Australian Capital Territory team was merged with the New South Wales team to form NSW/ACT; and from 1995, Australian Capital Territory was represented in interstate football as part of Australian Alliance, which also incorporated players from New South Wales, Queensland, Northern Territory and Tasmania.

Principal venues
There are several grounds around the ACT used by AFL Canberra, but only two with spectator facilities suitable for finals matches. In the 1990s, politician and former Canberra Raiders rugby league player Paul Osborne began a successful campaign to exclude the AFL from use of Canberra Stadium which ultimately resulted in its conversion into a rectangular field. As a result Manuka Oval remains the only venue in the ACT that meets AFL Standard criteria and have been used to host AFL (National Standard) or AFLW level matches (Regional Standard).

Audience

Attendance record
 14,974 (Round 19, 2016), AFL Greater Western Sydney Giants v Richmond Football Club (Manuka Oval, Canberra)

Books

References

External links
 "Canberra fans get a free kick in the guts after AFL drops the ball", The Canberra Times, 14 July 2006. Retrieved 16 July 2006
 ACT Team of the Century from Full Points Footy
 Canberra Carlton Blues Supporters Club
 Kangaroos ACT Supporters Club
 Canberra St Kilda Supporters Club
 AFL NSW/ACT
 AFL Canberra

Australian rules football in the Australian Capital Territory
Australian rules football by state or territory